Theodotion (gen.: Θεοδοτίωνος; died c. 200) was a Hellenistic Jewish scholar, perhaps working in Ephesus, who in c. 150 CE translated the Hebrew Bible into Greek. Whether he was revising the Septuagint, or was working from Hebrew manuscripts that represented a parallel tradition that has not survived, is debated. In the 2nd century Theodotion's text was quoted in The Shepherd of Hermas and in Justin Martyr's Dialogue with Trypho.

His finished version, which filled some lacunae in the Septuagint version of the Book of Jeremiah and Book of Job, formed one column in Origen of Alexandria's Hexapla, c. 240 CE. The Hexapla, now only extant in fragments, presented six Hebrew and Greek texts side-by-side: two Greek versions, by Aquila and Symmachus, and Theodotion's version following it, apparently reflecting a contemporary understanding of their historical sequence.

Theodotion's translation was so widely copied in the Early Christian church that its version of the Book of Daniel virtually superseded the Septuagint's. The Septuagint Daniel survives in only two known manuscripts, Codex Chisianus 88 (rediscovered in the 1770s), and Papyrus 967 (discovered 1931). Jerome, in his preface to Daniel (407 CE), records the rejection of the Septuagint version of that book in Christian usage: "I ... wish to emphasize to the reader the fact that it was not according to the Septuagint version but according to the version of Theodotion himself that the churches publicly read Daniel." Jerome's preface also mentions that the Hexapla had notations in it, indicating several major differences in content between the Theodotion Daniel and the earlier versions in Greek and Hebrew. However, Theodotion's Daniel is closer to the surviving Hebrew Masoretic Text version, the text which is the basis for most modern translations. Theodotion's Daniel is also the one embodied in the authorised edition of the Septuagint published by Sixtus V in 1587.

Theodotion's caution in transliterating Hebrew words for plants, animals, vestments and ritual regalia, and words of uncertain meaning, rather than adopting a Greek rendering, gave him a reputation of being "unlearned" among more confident post-Renaissance editors, such as Bernard de Montfaucon.

See also
 Aquila of Sinope
 Hexapla
 On Weights and Measures (Epiphanius)
 Symmachus

Notes

References
 Jewish Encyclopedia: "Theodotion" Details of Theodotion's insertions.
 Moses Gaster, 1894. The Unknown Aramaic Original of Theodotion's Additions to Daniel in Proceedings of the Society for Biblical Archaeology Vol. xvi. Demonstrating that the existing Aramaic text is itself an adaptation from the Greek of Theodotion, not its original.
 Emil Schürer in Herzog-Hauck, Real-Encyclopädie für protestantische Theologie i. 639 (1909)
 Dictionary of Christian Biography and Literature to the End of the Sixth Century (1911)

External links
 Theodotion's version - The Greek text and English translation of Theodotion's Greek version of the Old Testament.

2nd-century translators
Bible versions and translations
Translators from Hebrew
Translators of the Bible into Hellenistic Greek